is a Japanese football player. He plays for JEF United Chiba.

Playing career
Shota Arai joined to J2 League club; Tokyo Verdy in 2011. He moved to J1 League club; Kawasaki Frontale in 2013. In 2020, he joins JEF United Chiba.

Career statistics
Updated to 22 February 2019.

Honours

Club
J1 League (2) : 2017, 2018
J.League Cup (1) : 2019
Japanese Super Cup (1) : 2019

Individual
 J. League Cup MVP (1) : 2019

References

External links
Profile at Kawasaki Frontale

1988 births
Living people
Kokushikan University alumni
Association football people from Saitama Prefecture
Japanese footballers
J1 League players
J2 League players
Tokyo Verdy players
Kawasaki Frontale players
JEF United Chiba players
Association football goalkeepers